Paratheuma is a genus of cribellate araneomorph spiders in the family Dictynidae, and was first described by E. B. Bryant in 1940. Originally placed with the ground spiders, it was transferred to the intertidal spiders in 1975, and to the Dictynidae in 2016.

Species
 it contains eleven species:
Paratheuma andromeda Beatty & Berry, 1989 – Cook Is.
Paratheuma armata (Marples, 1964) – Caroline Is. to Samoa
Paratheuma australis Beatty & Berry, 1989 – Australia (Queensland), Fiji
Paratheuma awasensis Shimojana, 2013 – Japan (Okinawa)
Paratheuma enigmatica Zamani, Marusik & Berry, 2016 – Iran
Paratheuma insulana (Banks, 1902) (type) – USA, Caribbean. Introduced to Japan
Paratheuma interaesta (Roth & Brown, 1975) – Mexico
Paratheuma makai Berry & Beatty, 1989 – Hawaii
Paratheuma ramseyae Beatty & Berry, 1989 – Cook Is.
Paratheuma rangiroa Beatty & Berry, 1989 – Polynesia
Paratheuma shirahamaensis (Oi, 1960) – Korea, Japan

References

Araneomorphae genera
Dictynidae
Spiders of Asia
Spiders of North America
Spiders of Oceania